Bording may refer to:

People
 Anders Bording (1619–1677), Danish poet
 Jacob Bording (1511–1560), Flemish medical doctor and physician
 Jakob Bording (1547–1616), German-born Danish politician

Places
 Bording, Denmark, a railway town in Central Jutland, Denmark